Perth Superdrome, known as HBF Stadium under a commercial naming rights arrangement, is a sports complex in Perth, Western Australia. It is home to the Western Australian Institute of Sport (WAIS).

The complex was opened in 1986. It received its current name through a naming-rights sponsorship deal with the HBF Health Fund in 2014. Although the previous sponsorship with Challenge Bank expired in 2002, the Challenge Stadium name remained in use until 2014.

Facilities include an Olympic-standard aquatic centre with five pools, a diving tower, gymnasium, two arenas, and several basketball courts, as well as a café, childcare centre, sports store, office accommodation and a museum.

The main indoor arena has seating for 4,500 spectators, or for over 5,000 people including standing room. Regular exhibitions and expos are hosted at the venue, as well as national and international sporting events.

History

 
Between 1987–89 and 2002–12, the Perth Superdrome was the home venue of the Perth Wildcats, who play in the National Basketball League (NBL). The Wildcats played in four NBL Grand Final series at the stadium, in 1987, 2002/03, 2009/10 and 2011/12, with the only championship coming in 2009/10. During Wildcats' games, the venue was referred to as "The Jungle". The Wildcats' final game at the stadium was their 87–86 win over the New Zealand Breakers in Game 2 of the 2011/12 NBL Grand Final series in front of 4,400 fans.

The aquatic centre hosted the FINA World Aquatics Championships in 1991 and 1998. The Australian Swimming Championships were held there in 1993, as well as the national short-course championships in 2001 and 2012.

Beginning in 2008, the stadium served as the main home court for the West Coast Fever, who play in the National Netball League. To the Fever, the stadium is known as "The Cauldron". The Fever moved all their home matches to Perth Arena at the end of the 2018 season.

In 2013, a WAIS High Performance Service Centre commenced construction. It now comprises a strength and conditioning gym, multi-purpose training and testing area,  four lane indoor runway for long jump, sprinting and throwing sports, hydrotherapy and recovery pools, physiology and environmental laboratories, consultation rooms, athlete amenities and office space.

As a music venue
For most of the 2000s, following the closure of the Perth Entertainment Centre, HBF Stadium was the main venue used by major touring artists, both Australian and international, when visiting Perth. Since the opening of Perth Arena in 2012, the number of concerts at HBF Stadium has decreased.

2000s

2003
 Craig David – 4 November 2003
 Cold Chisel – 11 December 2003

2004
 P!nk – 30 April 2004

2005
 Avril Lavigne –  6 April 2005
 Simple Plan – 11 October 2005
 Kelly Clarkson – 4 November 2005

2006
 Status Quo & Deep Purple –  3 May 2006  	
 Wolfmother – 16 July 2006  	
 The Strokes – 9 August 2006
 INXS – 12 September 2006	
 Westlife – 17 September 2006
 Rogue Traders – 5 October 2006  	
 Live – 24 October 2006
 

2007
 Evanescence – 15 February 2007
 Westlife – 21 February 2007
 P!nk – 18–20 April & 2–4 June 2007
 Human Nature – 22–23 June 2007
 Heaven & Hell & Down – 2 August 2007
 The Cure – 4 August 2007
 Fall Out Boy – 29 September 2007
 Marilyn Manson – 13 October 2007
 Motörhead – 16 October 2007
 Good Charlotte – 17 October 2007	

2008
 Kelly Clarkson – 1 March 2008
 The Black Crowes – 26 March 2008
 James Blunt – 9 May 2008
 Michael Bublé – 11–12 & 14–15 June 2008
 Paul Weller – 13 August 2008
 Panic! at the Disco – 27 August 2008
 Disturbed – 29 August 2008
 Judas Priest – 16 September 2008

2009  
 Fall Out Boy – 15 February 2009
 The Veronicas – 28 February & 1 March 2009
 The Living End – 22 May 2009
 Alice Cooper – 1 September 2009
 Chris Isaak – 16 & 17 September 2009
 Suzi Quatro – 22 September 2009
 Marilyn Manson – 5 October 2009
 Slayer & Megadeth – 13 October 2009
 Short Stack – 13 December 2009

2010s

2010
 Them Crooked Vultures – 19 January 2010
 Backstreet Boys – 2 March 2010
 Status Quo – 17 March 2010
 Short Stack – 26 March 2010
 Kelly Clarkson – 22 April 2010
 Deep Purple – 5 May 2010
 Yusuf – 10 June 2010
 Thirty Seconds to Mars – 24 July 2010
 Mika Singh – 7 August 2010
 Florence and the Machine – 10 August 2010
 Bullet for My Valentine – 5 September 2010
 Parkway Drive – 3 October 2010
 Paramore – 10 October 2010
 Village People – 20 October 2010
 Creedence Clearwater Revisited – 13 October 2010
 Jason Derülo – 2 November 2010
 Pendulum – 6 November 2010

2011
 Kesha – 7 March 2011
 Stone Temple Pilots – 16 March 2011
 The Script – 2 April 2011
 Good Charlotte – 15 April 2011
 Cirque Du Soleil – 21 April to 8 May 2011
 Eason Chan – 20 May 2011
 Bliss N Eso – 21 May 2011
 Parkway Drive – 27 May 2011
 Rise Against – 23 July 2011
 Winterbeatz – 17 August 2011
 Alice Cooper – 2 October 2011
 The Wombats – 11 October 2011
 Steely Dan & Steve Winwood – 18 October 2011

2012
 Tim Minchin – 10 & 12 February 2012
 Roxette – 28 & 29 February 2012
 Flight of the Conchords – 18, 19 & 20 July 2012
 The Smashing Pumpkins – 26 July 2012
 Hilltop Hoods – 17 August 2012
 Kelly Clarkson – 5 October 2012
 Roch Voisine – 24 November 2012
 Parkway Drive – 19 December 2012

2013
 X Factor Live – 16 January 2013
 Ringo Starr & His All-Starr Band – 21 February 2013
 Ed Sheeran – 23 February 2013
 Flume – 13 May 2013
 Alt-J – 27 July 2013
 Bring Me the Horizon – 12 October 2013
 Eros Ramazzotti – 23 November 2013
 Simple Plan – 3 December 2013

2014
 Thirty Seconds to Mars – 25 March 2014
 Ellie Goulding – 28 May 2014
 Bastille – 18 June 2014
 Lorde – 5 July 2014
 Anna Vissi – 3 October 2014

2016
 The 1975 – 23 January 2016
Troye Sivan – 13 August 2016
Bring Me the Horizon – 14 September 2016
2017
 Charles Aznavour – 1 October 2017
J.Cole – 9 December 2017

2018
Live – 6 January 2018
Halsey – 24 April 2018
5 Seconds of Summer – 18 August 2018

References

External links

 

 
 Heritage Council WA

Netball venues in Western Australia
Sports venues in Perth, Western Australia
Sports venues completed in 1986
Perth Wildcats
Perth Lynx
West Coast Fever
Defunct National Basketball League (Australia) venues
Basketball venues in Australia
Swimming venues in Australia
Music venues in Perth, Western Australia
Indoor arenas in Australia
Boxing venues in Australia
Darts venues
Mount Claremont, Western Australia
Water polo venues in Australia